Siddhartha University is a Buddhist university in Nepal.

External links
 University homepage

Universities and colleges in Nepal
Buddhist universities and colleges